Luzhai County is under the administration of Liuzhou, Guangxi Zhuang Autonomous Region, China. The easternmost county-level division of Liuzhou City, it borders the prefecture-level cities of Guilin to the north and east and Laibin to the southeast.

Climate

References

External links 

Counties of Guangxi
Liuzhou